Kai Rabe gegen die Vatikankiller (Kai Rabe vs. the Vatican Killers) is a 1998 German comedy film directed by Thomas Jahn.

Cast
 Steffen Wink as Kai Rabe
 Klaus J. Behrendt as Bernd Krüger
 Sandra Speichert as Maria Rall
  as Rufus Lindner
 Heinz Hoenig as Egon Lütter
 Hannelore Elsner as Hilde Strassburger
 Mirco Nontschew as Solomon
 Jan Josef Liefers as Marc Hohlmann
 Brion James as Monk
 Ercan Durmaz as Ezekiel
 Edgar Selge as Michael Walner
 Anna Loos as Esther
 Thierry Van Werveke
 Huub Stapel as Karl Bresser
 Dietmar Bär
 Bernd Michael Lade
 Markus Knüfken as Kurzte

External links
 
Kai Rabe gegen die Vatikankiller

1998 films
1990s crime comedy films
German crime comedy films
1990s German-language films
Films directed by Thomas Jahn
Films about filmmaking
German black comedy films
1990s black comedy films
1990s German films